Machiste is a supporting character in the Warlord a sword and sorcery comic book published by DC Comics. Machiste debuts in Warlord #2 (March 1976), and was created by Mike Grell.

Fictional character biography
Machiste is the wandering King of Kiro in the other dimensional realm of Skartaris, land of endless sun. He met Travis Morgan when they both served as galley slaves aboard the ship Gyrfalcon. They quickly became close friends and both were sold as gladiators. Former gladiator Shebal trained them both in the arts of the arena. Travis Morgan led 200 gladiators (including Machiste) in a massive revolt. These rebel gladiators became the core of an army that Travis Morgan successfully led against the tyrannical king of Thera, his future archenemy Deimos. It was as the leader of this new army, that Travis first became known as the Warlord. Deimos had intended to conquer the rest of Skartaris using the advanced technology of ancient Atlantis.

After Deimos' defeat, Machiste returned to his home kingdom of Kiro. While there he found an ancient cursed axe containing a demonic entity which took possession of his mind. The demon's will prevented Machiste from letting go of the axe. In issue #7 Travis Morgan arrived in Kiro. Machiste revealed to him the secret he had hinted at during their captivity - Machiste was the King of Kiro. 

Seeing that the axe's influence was making Machiste more and more tyrannical as well as violent, Travis was forced to remove his friend's right hand, thus severing the axe's spell. Machiste replaced his lost right hand with a spike studded mace. This is also the first meeting of Machiste and his future lover Mariah Romanova. Mariah was a Moscow University archaeology student and Olympic fencer who had recently stumbled into Skartaris at Travis Morgan's side. Machiste shaves his head in issue #10 because the golden crown of Kiro he wears doesn't fit comfortably over his hair.

Machiste leaves Kiro to accompany Morgan and Mariah in Morgan's search for Tara. Both Mariah and Machiste fall through a time warp and end up back in Skartaris' "Age of Wizard Kings", when Skartaris was known as Wizard World. While there they meet Eran Shadowstorm the Centaur a Protector of the Realm, Mongo Ironhand the Wizard, and Rostov the werewolf. While stranded in the past Machiste and Mariah became lovers.

Later Machiste and Mariah returned to "present day" Skartaris. Upon their return they were enlisted in Travis Morgan's war against New Atlantis. Once New Atlantis was defeated Machiste returned to Kiro and his duties as king. Later on, due to Mariah throwing herself at Travis Morgan after Tara's death, there is a falling out between Machiste and Morgan, but the good friends eventually repair their friendship.

In Secret Six, Machiste is ruler of the land that Bane wishes to conquer for the United States of America. He fights against the invaders, but eventually realises that he cannot win without the aid of Deimos.

Other versions

Flashpoint
In the alternate timeline of the Flashpoint event, Machiste is a member of Deathstroke's pirates. During an ambush by Aquaman and Ocean Master, Machiste was about to strike at Aquaman, but Aquaman slashes his throat with his own prosthetic axe.

In other media

Television
 Machiste appeared in the Justice League Unlimited episode "Chaos at the Earth's Core", voiced by Phil LaMarr.
 Machiste made a brief appearance in the DC Original Movie Justice League: The Flashpoint Paradox. Unlike in the comics Machiste has his neck snapped by Aquagirl.

Toys
 He also had an action figure in the "Lost World of the Warlord" line from Remco in 1982.

References

External links
 DCU Guide: Machiste
 Fanzing #0: Welcome to the Lost World, a summary of the series.
 Fanzing #0: Warlord Reading Guide
Characters created by Mike Grell
Comics characters introduced in 1976

DC Comics superheroes
Fictional kings
Fantasy comics